Oncaea is a genus of copepods.  The genus contains bioluminescent species. Unlike other bioluminescent copepods, Oncaea have an internal (non-secreted) bioluminescence. Oncaea contains the following species:

Oncaea africana Shmeleva, 1979
Oncaea alboranica Shmeleva, 1979
Oncaea atlantica Shmeleva, 1967
Oncaea bispinosa Böttger-Schnack, 2002
Oncaea bowmani Heron, 1977
Oncaea brocha Heron, 1977
Oncaea brodskii Shmeleva, 1968
Oncaea clevei Früchtl, 1923
Oncaea compacta Heron, 1977
Oncaea convexa Heron, 1977
Oncaea cristata Böttger-Schnack, 2005
Oncaea crypta Böttger-Schnack, 2005
Oncaea curta G. O. Sars, 1916
Oncaea curvata Giesbrecht, 1902
Oncaea damkaeri Heron, 1977
Oncaea delicata Heron, English & Damkaer, 1984
Oncaea englishi Heron, 1977
Oncaea furnestini Shmeleva, 1979
Oncaea glabra Heron & Frost, 2000
Oncaea grossa Heron & Frost, 2000
Oncaea heronae Malt, 1982
Oncaea illgi Heron, 1977
Oncaea infantula K. T. Gordeeva, 1972
Oncaea insolita Heron & Frost, 2000
Oncaea lacinia Heron, English & Damkaer, 1984
Oncaea latimana K. T. Gordeeva, 1975
Oncaea longipes Shmeleva, 1968
Oncaea longiseta Shmeleva, 1968
Oncaea macilenta Heron, 1977
Oncaea media Giesbrecht, 1891
Oncaea mediterranea (Claus, 1863)
Oncaea memorata K. T. Gordeeva, 1973
Oncaea minima Shmeleva, 1968
Oncaea minor Shmeleva, 1979
Oncaea mollicula K. T. Gordeeva, 1975
Oncaea notopus Giesbrecht, 1891
Oncaea oceanica K. T. Gordeeva, 1972
Oncaea olsoni Heron, 1977
Oncaea ornata Giesbrecht, 1891
Oncaea ovalis Shmeleva, 1966
Oncaea parabathyalis Böttger-Schnack, 2005
Oncaea paraclevei Böttger-Schnack, 2001
Oncaea parila Heron, 1977
Oncaea petila Heron, 1977
Oncaea philippinensis (Kazachenko & Avdeev, 1977)
Oncaea platysetosa Boxshall & Böttger, 1987
Oncaea prendeli Shmeleva, 1966
Oncaea prolata Heron, 1977
Oncaea pumilis Heron, 1977
Oncaea rimula Heron & Frost, 2000
Oncaea rotata Heron & Frost, 2000
Oncaea rotunda Heron, 1977
Oncaea rotundata Boxshall, 1977
Oncaea scottodicarloi Heron & Bradford-Grieve, 1995
Oncaea setosa Heron, 1977
Oncaea shmelevi K. T. Gordeeva, 1972
Oncaea tenella G. O. Sars, 1916
Oncaea tenuimana Giesbrecht, 1891
Oncaea tregoubovi Shmeleva, 1968
Oncaea venusta Philippi, 1843
Oncaea vodjanitskii Shmeleva & Delalo, 1965
Oncaea waldemari Bersano & Boxshall, 1996
Oncaea walleni Heron, 1977
Oncaea zernovi Shmeleva, 1966

A number of nomina dubia and species inquirendae have also been described in Oncaea:
Nomina dubia
Oncaea neobscura Razouls, 1969
Oncaea obscura Farran, 1908
Oncaea parobscura Shmeleva, 1979
Species inquirendae
Oncaea bathyalis Shmeleva, 1968
Oncaea crassimana (Dana, 1849)
Oncaea frosti Heron, 2002
Oncaea gracilis (Dana, 1852)
Oncaea obtusa (Dana, 1852)

References

Poecilostomatoida
Bioluminescent copepods
Copepod genera